Larking is a surname. Notable people with the surname include:

Gunhild Larking (born 1936), Swedish high jumper
John Larking (1921–1998), English cricketer
Lambert Blackwell Larking (1797–1868), English clergyman, writer and antiquarian
Ron Larking (1890–1918), Australian rules footballer